Rudolf Felix Geyer (born 13 October 1933) is a Dutch sociologist and cybernetician, former head of the methodology section of SISWO (Interuniversity Institute for Social Science Research) at the University of Amsterdam, known for his work in the fields of Social alienation, and on sociocybernetics.

Biography  
Born in Amsterdam, Geyer began studies in geology at the University of Amsterdam in 1951 and received his BA in 1953. He continued with studies in sociology and received his MA at the University of Amsterdam in 1961. Later in 1980 he received his PhD under  Hiddo M. Jolles with a thesis, entitled "Alienation theories : a general systems approach".

In the 1960s Geyer started working in industry, where he worked in the fields of marketing and labor market research. In 1968 he joined the Interuniversity Institute for Social Science Research (SISWO) at the University of Amsterdam, where he became head of the methodology section. He held this position until his retirement in 1998. In 1970 Geyer was one of the co-founders of the Dutch Systems Group, and served on its board.

Selected publications  
 Geyer, R. Felix. Alienation Theories: A general systems approach. Pergamon Press, 1980.
 Geyer, Felix, and Johannes van der Zouwen, eds. Sociocybernetic Paradoxes: observation, control and evolution of self-steering systems. Sage, 1986.
 Geyer, R. Felix. Alienation, ethnicity, and postmodernism. No. 116. Praeger, 1996.
 Geyer, R. Felix, and David R. Schweitzer, eds. Alienation, problems of meaning, theory, and method. Routledge/Thoemms Press, 1981.
 Geyer, R. Felix, and Johannes van der Zouwen, eds. Sociocybernetics: Complexity, autopoiesis, and observation of social systems. No. 132. Greenwood Publishing Group, 2001.

Articles a selection
 Felix Geyer and Johannes van der Zouwen. "Sociocybernetics" in: Handbook of Cybernetics (C.V. Negoita, ed.). New York: Marcel Dekker, 1992, pp. 95–124.
 Felix Geyer. "The Challenge of Sociocybernetics". In: Kybernetes. 24(4):6-32, 1995. Copyright MCB University Press1995
 Felix Geyer. "Sociocybernetics" In: Kybernetes, Vol. 31 No. 7/8, 2002, pp. 1021–1042.

References

External links 
 Felix Geyer at the University of Zaragoza

Dutch sociologists
Dutch systems scientists
Cyberneticists
1933 births
Living people
University of Amsterdam alumni
Academic staff of the University of Amsterdam
Scientists from Amsterdam
20th-century Dutch scientists
21st-century Dutch scientists